Fusigobius is a genus of coral reef inhabiting gobies found throughout the Indian and western Pacific Oceans.

Species
There are currently nine recognized species in this genus:
 Fusigobius aureus I. S. Chen & K. T. Shao, 1997
 Fusigobius duospilus Hoese & Reader, 1985 (Barenape Goby)
 Fusigobius inframaculatus (J. E. Randall, 1994) (Blotched Sand Goby)
 Fusigobius longispinus Goren, 1978 (Orange-spotted Sand-goby)
 Fusigobius maximus (J. E. Randall, 2001)
 Fusigobius melacron (J. E. Randall, 2001)
 Fusigobius neophytus (Günther, 1877) (Common Fusegoby)
 Fusigobius pallidus (J. E. Randall, 2001)
 Fusigobius signipinnis Hoese & Obika, 1988 (Signalfin Goby)
 Fusigobius? venadicus Carolin, Bajpai, Maurya & Schwarzhans 2022 (otolith based fossil species, Burdigalian)

References

 
Gobiinae